El Encanto is a town and municipality in the Amazonas Department, Colombia. It is located in the mouth of the Caraparaná River, tributary of the Putumayo River (Içá).
El Encanto can be reached by air or river. The local navy base has a runway available only to military and official planes, these were established during the Colombia-Peru War. By river the closest towns with airport access are Puerto Arturo, Peru from downstream, and Puerto Leguízamo (Putumayo Department, Colombia) upstream.

The majority of inhabitants in the area are Huitotos indigenous tribes.

Climate
El Encanto has a tropical rainforest climate (Köppen Af) with heavy rainfall year-round.

References

External links

 El Encanto official website

Municipalities of Amazonas Department